Standards in Public Office may refer to:
Standards in Public Office Commission, an Irish statutory body concerned with disclosure of interests, election expenditure and registration of lobbying
Standards in Public Office (TV show), an Irish television programme broadcast in December 2015